The Asia/Oceania Zone is one of the three zones of regional Davis Cup competition in 2013.

In the Asia/Oceania Zone there are four different groups in which teams compete against each other to advance to the next group.

Participating nations

Seeds:
 
 
 
 

Remaining Nations:

Draw

 relegated to Group II in 2014.
 and  advance to World Group Play-off.

First round

Chinese Taipei vs. Australia

Uzbekistan vs. China

India vs. South Korea

Japan vs. Indonesia

Second round

Uzbekistan vs. Australia

Japan vs. South Korea

Play-off

China vs. Chinese Taipei

India vs. Indonesia

Relegation play-off

Chinese Taipei vs. Indonesia

References

External links
Official Website

Asia Oceania Zone I
Davis Cup Asia/Oceania Zone